Acheampong is an Ashanti surname, which means destined for greatness. Notable people with the Ashanti surname include:

 Benjamin Acheampong (born 1990), Ghanaian footballer
 Gemma Acheampong (born 1993), American-Ghanaian track and field athlete
 Faustina Acheampong, wife of Ignatius Kutu Acheampong, First Lady of Ghana
 Frank Acheampong (born 1993), Ghanaian footballer
 Ignatius Kutu Acheampong (1931–1979), former President of Ghana
 Joachin Yaw Acheampong (born 1973), Ghanaian footballer
 Joey Acheampong (born 1982), Ghanaian footballer, scored 29 goals for Aylesbury United F.C. in 2010–2014
 Kwame Nkrumah-Acheampong (born 1974), Ghanaian skier
Nana Acheampong, Ghanaian musician
 Patrick Kwateng Acheampong (born 1951), Ghanaian lawyer
 Rebecca Akosua Acheampomaa Acheampong popularly known as Becca (born 1984) Ghanaian singer
 Vivienne Acheampong, British actor and comedian.

See also 
 Emmanuel Akyeampong, professor of history and African and African American Studies
 Accompong, a Maroon town in Jamaica

References 

Surnames of Ashanti origin
Surnames of Akan origin